The 14th Games of the Small States of Europe, also known as the XIVth Games of the Small States of Europe were held between 30 May – 4 June 2011 in multiple municipalities in Liechtenstein. The Games featured competition by the 9 members of the GSSE in nine sports, with three of the sports featuring seven disciplines. Events were located in nine different municipalities in the country.

Liechtenstein was not opposed in their bid for the 2011 Games, possibly because it was the country's turn to host the Games based on the event's rotation. The 2011 Games marked the second time Liechtenstein has hosted the Games, following the country's hosting of the 8th edition in 1999. These were the first games with the participation of Montenegro.

Games

Participating teams

  (64)
  (131)
  (113)
  (75) (Host team)
  (111)
  (72)
  (89)
  (20) (Debut)
  (75)

Sports
Numbers in parentheses indicate the number of medal events contested in each sport.

 
 
  Mountain biking (2)
  Road (4)

Venues

Calendar

Medal table
Key

References

External links
 

 
Games of the Small States of Europe
Games of the Small States of Europe
Games of the Small States of Europe
Games of the Small States of Europe
Games Of The Small States Of Europe
Games Of The Small States Of Europe
Multi-sport events in Liechtenstein
International sports competitions hosted by Liechtenstein